Maria Tsouri (born May 25, 1986) is a Greek water polo player, part of Greece women's national water polo team that won the Silver Medal at the 2010 European Championship in Zagreb, the Gold Medal at the 2005 FINA Women's Water Polo World League in Kirishi and the Bronze Medal at the 2010 World League in San Diego. She also competed with the Greece women's national water polo team in the 2006 European Water Polo Championship (6th place), the 2007 World Championship (8th place), the 2008 European Championship (6th place) and the 2008 Olympic Games in Beijing (8th place).

At club level, she played -most notably- for Olympiacos, Ethnikos Piraeus and Glyfada. She won the LEN Trophy in 2010 with Ethnikos, and the 2011 Greek Championship (as well as the third place at the 2010–11 LEN Champions Cup) with Olympiacos.

Personal
Maria is married with the Greek basketball player Panagiotis Vasilopoulos since 2012. The couple has two sons.

See also
 Greece women's Olympic water polo team records and statistics
 List of women's Olympic water polo tournament goalkeepers

References

External links
 

1986 births
Living people
Greek female water polo players
Water polo goalkeepers
Olympic water polo players of Greece
Water polo players at the 2008 Summer Olympics
Olympiacos Women's Water Polo Team players

Ethnikos Piraeus Water Polo Club players
Sportspeople from Chios
21st-century Greek women